The 1983 Walker Cup, the 29th Walker Cup Match, was played on 25 and 26 May 1983, at Royal Liverpool Golf Club, Hoylake, England. The event was won by the United States 13½ to 10½.

The match was level after the second day foursomes. In the final round of 8 singles, Great Britain and Ireland had just two wins, by Philip Walton and Andrew Oldcorn, both of whom had also won their singles on the first day. The United States won 5 of the singles matches and halved the other to win the Walker Cup for the sixth successive time.

Format
The format for play on Wednesday and Thursday was the same. There were four matches of foursomes in the morning and eight singles matches in the afternoon. In all, 24 matches were played.

Each of the 24 matches was worth one point in the larger team competition. If a match was all square after the 18th hole extra holes were not played. Rather, each side earned ½ a point toward their team total. The team that accumulated at least 12½ points won the competition. If the two teams were tied, the previous winner would retain the trophy.

Teams
Ten players for the United States and Great Britain & Ireland participated in the event. The United States had a playing captain, while Great Britain & Ireland had a non-playing captain.

Great Britain & Ireland
 & 
Captain:  Charlie Green
 David Carrick
 Stephen Keppler
 Malcolm Lewis
 George Macgregor
 Lindsay Mann
 Andrew Oldcorn
 Philip Parkin
 Arthur Pierse
 Martin Thompson
 Philip Walton

United States

Playing captain: Jay Sigel
Nathaniel Crosby
Brad Faxon
Rick Fehr
William Hoffer
Jim Holtgrieve
Bob Lewis
David Tentis
Billy Tuten
Willie Wood

Wednesday's matches

Morning foursomes

Afternoon singles

Thursday's matches

Morning foursomes

Afternoon singles

References

Walker Cup
Golf tournaments in England
Walker Cup
Walker Cup
Walker Cup